Akrav israchanani is an extinct species of scorpions from the Ayyalon Cave in Israel.

Description 
Akrav israchanani was an eyeless, brown, troglobitic scorpion of about 50mm in length first described from only 20 dry, cuticular remains of hollow carcasses. The combinations of characteristics was unusual enough for the scorpion to be placed in its own, monotypic family, however this has been called into question by later researchers.

Habitat and Distribution 
The scorpion was originally known only from the Ayyalon Cave in Israel, a deep limestone cave, isolated from rainwater and the surface by a layer of chalk. The extinction of the scorpion is inferred from the lack of live or recently dead specimens. In December 2015, more scorpion remains were found in the nearby Levana Cave.

References 

Endemic fauna of Israel
Animals described in 2007
Extinct arachnids
Scorpions